Falejówka  (Faliyivka) is a village in the administrative district of Gmina Sanok, within Sanok County, Subcarpathian Voivodeship, in south-eastern Poland.

The village has a population of 600.

Official website: http://falejowka.pl/

References

Villages in Sanok County